Mortimer Ewen (5 September 1816 – 1887) was an English cricketer.  Ewen's batting and bowling styles are unknown.  He was born at Lodsworth, Sussex.

Ewen made his first-class debut for Sussex against Kent in 1839.  He made five further first-class appearances for the county, the last of which came against the Marylebone Cricket Club in 1843.  In his six first-class matches for Sussex, he scored 61 runs at an average of 6.77, with a high score of 23.  With the ball, he took 3 wickets, though his bowling average and best figures are unknown due to incomplete records.  He also made a single first-class appearance for Petworth in 1844 against the Marylebone Cricket Club at Petworth Park New Ground.  He ended Petworth's first-innings unbeaten on 13, while in their second-innings he was dismissed for 7 runs by William Hillyer.  Petworth won this low scoring match by 3 wickets.

He died at Midhurst, Sussex in 1887.

References

External links
Mortimer Ewen at ESPNcricinfo
Mortimer Ewen at CricketArchive

1816 births
1887 deaths
People from Lodsworth
English cricketers
Sussex cricketers
Petworth cricketers